Ağbulaq (also, Agbulak and Akh-Bulakh) is a village and the least populous municipality in the Jalilabad Rayon of Azerbaijan.  It has a population of 77.

References 

Populated places in Jalilabad District (Azerbaijan)